Rideback (stylized as RɪᴅᴇBᴀᴄᴋ) is a Japanese manga series written and illustrated by Tetsurō Kasahara. It was serialized in Shogakukan's seinen manga magazine Monthly Ikki from April 2003 to October 2008, with its chapters collected in ten tankōbon volumes. Set in Japan in the 2020s, it follows the story of college student Rin Ogata, as she comes across a two-wheeled automobile robot known as a Rideback. It was adapted into a twelve-episode anime television series by Madhouse broadcast from January to March 2009. In North America, Funimation licensed the anime series for English release.

Plot
Rin Ogata was a promising up-and-coming ballet dancer but suffered a serious injury while dancing and decided to quit. Years later in college, she comes across a club building and soon finds herself intrigued by a transforming motorcycle-like robotic vehicle called a "Rideback". She soon finds that her unique ballet skills with balance and finesse make her a born natural on a Rideback. However, those same skills also get her into serious trouble with the government.

Characters

Musashino University Rideback Club

A college student. Being the daughter of a talented dancer, she was therefore expected to be their natural successor, having participated in dancing competitions from a young age. However, she fractured her left foot while dancing and subsequently decided to leave it, later enrolling in the theater department of Musashino University, where she first comes across the Rideback Fuego.

Third year student in the French literature department and a senior to both to Rin and Haruki. The Rideback champion of Japan.

Head of the Rideback team. Possessing a strict character and a large nose.

Second year student in the English department and Rin's senior. An enthusiast of Ridebacks.

Childhood friend of Rin's.

First year student in the sociology department. Being a huge fan of Rin, she is extremely enthusiastic.

GGP (GGF in manga)

The corrupt commander of the GGP. He runs the government with a dictatorship approach. He is shot and killed by Misawo. He is an anime original character.

Lecturer at Musashino University's department of literature and adviser to the Rideback team. In reality, however, she is a member of the GGP.

BMA

A soldier of BMA, who rides a black Rideback. In his early years, he served in the same GGP unit as Okakura and Kallenbach before later defecting to the BMA.

Rin's younger brother.

Other characters

Rin's mother. A talented ballet dancer who died six years before the series' story.

A freelance journalist.

An executive of the Metropolitan Police Department and Tamayo's older brother.

Media

Manga
Shogakukan collected its chapters in ten tankōbon volumes, published from May 28, 2004, to February 25, 2009.

Volume list

Anime

An anime adaptation was announced in April 2007. The twelve-episode series was animated by Madhouse and directed by Atsushi Takahashi. It was broadcast on Chiba TV, TV Saitama, tvk, KBS Kyoto, Sun TV, Tokyo MX and AT-X from January 12 to March 30, 2009.

In North America, Funimation announced the license to the series at Anime Central in May 2010. Funimation released the series on Blu-ray and DVD on June 28, 2011. The series made its American television debut on July 26, 2011 on Funimation Channel.

Novel
A novel, titled  was released by Shogakukan, under its Gagaga Bunko, on January 21, 2009.

See also
Atom: The Beginning, a manga series illustrated by Tetsuro Kasahara

Notes

References

Further reading

External links
  
  
 
 

2003 manga
2009 Japanese novels
2009 anime television series debuts
Action anime and manga
Comics set in the 2020s
Fiction set in 2025
Funimation
Gagaga Bunko
Light novels
Madhouse (company)
Mecha anime and manga
NBCUniversal Entertainment Japan
Novels set in the 2020s
Seinen manga
Shogakukan franchises
Shogakukan manga
Television series set in the 2020s